Motivation is the driving force by which humans achieve their goals.

Motivation may also refer to:

Music
Motivation (band), a 1980s English rock band
Motivation (Bertín Osborne album) or the title song, 1989
Motivation (Moti Special album) or the title song, 1985
"Motivation" (Kelly Rowland song), 2011
"Motivation" (Normani song), 2019
"Motivation" (Sum 41 song), 2002
"Motivation", a song by Sheryl Crow from Detours, 2008
"Motivation", a song by Snoop Dogg from 220, 2018

Other uses
Motivation (horse) (foaled 1987), a Thoroughbred racehorse
The Motivation, a 2013 American documentary film
"Motivation" (I Pity the Fool), a 2006 television episode
"Motivation" (Startup U), a 2015 television episode
Motivation High School, a magnet school in Philadelphia, Pennsylvania, US

See also

Motiv8 (disambiguation)
Motivate (disambiguation)
Motive (disambiguation)